Pyotr Leonidovich Gassiev (born 18 June 1972) is a South Ossetian politician who served as the Speaker of the South Ossetian Parliament from 7 June 2017 until 20 June 2019.

References

1972 births
Living people
Ossetian politicians
People from Tskhinvali